Colin James Bundy (born 4 October 1944) is a South African historian, former principal of Green Templeton College, Oxford and former director of SOAS University of London. Bundy was an influential member of a generation of historians who substantially revised understanding of South African history. In particular, he wrote on South Africa's rural past from a predominantly Marxist perspective, but also deploying Africanist and underdevelopment theories. Since the mid-1990s, however, Bundy has held a series of posts in university administration. Bundy is also a trustee of the Canon Collins Educational & Legal Assistance Trust.

Education 

He received his secondary education at Graeme College, Grahamstown in the Eastern Cape Province.

Bundy was educated at the University of Natal (B.A.) and the University of the Witwatersrand (B.A. (Hons)). He was then a Rhodes Scholar at Merton College, Oxford (1968–70) and a Beit Senior Research Scholar at St Antony's (1970–72), graduating as an M.Phil. and D.Phil. of the University of Oxford with a thesis entitled

Career 

Bundy was director and principal of the School of Oriental and African Studies (2001–06); deputy vice-chancellor of the University of London (2003–06); vice-chancellor and principal of the University of the Witwatersrand (1997-2001); and director of the Institute for Historical Research (1992–94) and vice-rector (1994-97), University of the Western Cape.

He returned to Oxford as a research fellow at Queen Elizabeth House (1979–80) and in the Department for External Studies (1980–84), subsequently being elected an honorary fellow of Kellogg College. From 2006 until 2008 he was warden of Green College, Oxford, becoming the first principal of Green Templeton College on 1 October 2008, when Green College merged with Templeton College. He retired from this position on 1 October 2010.

National Life Stories conducted an oral history interview (C1149/14) with Colin Bundy in 2010 for its Oral History of Oral History collection held by the British Library.

He is an Honorary Fellow of St Edmund's College, Cambridge.

Publications 

His publications include:

 
 
 Remaking the Past: New Perspectives in South African History (Cape Town: University of Cape Town, 1987)
  (with William Beinart)

References

External links 

 Guardian profile, 2004
 Talk by Bundy on Globalisation and universities, 1999
 Talk by Bundy on education in South Africa, 2003
 Article by Bundy on truth and reconciliation in South Africa, 1999
 Two-part video of Professor Bundy discussing the implications of the collapse of the Soviet Union on the prospects for global Marxist revolution
 
 

1944 births
University of Natal alumni
University of the Witwatersrand alumni
Alumni of Merton College, Oxford
South African emigrants to the United Kingdom
People associated with SOAS University of London
People associated with the University of London
Living people
South African historians
Marxist historians
South African Marxists
Academic staff of the University of the Western Cape
South African Rhodes Scholars
Alumni of Graeme College
Academics of the University of Oxford
Fellows of Green Templeton College, Oxford
20th-century South African historians
Wardens of Green College, Oxford
Principals of Green Templeton College, Oxford
Historians of South Africa
Vice-Chancellors of the University of the Witwatersrand
21st-century English historians